Battle of the Basya (Basia) River took place between 24 September and 10 October 1660, between the forces of the Polish–Lithuanian Commonwealth and the Tsardom of Russia, allied with the Cossacks and Tatars, near Basya river in the modern Mahilyow Voblast. Russian army of about 15,000 under Yury Dolgorukov met the Polish force of about 24,000 under Stefan Czarniecki. The first skirmishes were between the cavalleries of both sides with Russians being victorious.

A full-scale battle took place on 28 September on a big field near the village Gubarev. Supported by the artillery, the Russian infantry launched a successful attack on the center of the Polish forces which were seriously decimated. On the flanks, however, the Polish cavalry began to prevail over the Russian one and forced it to retreat in disorder, allowing the main body of the Russian army to be surrounded. However, the Russians continued to fight and didn't abandon the field until the end of Polish attacks and their withdrawal. Both sides suffered heavy losses.

The hostilities resumed on 10 October after Russians received reinforcement by 900 men of voyevoda Maxim Rtishchev. The army of Dolgorukov managed to throw a forthcoming force of Michał Kazimierz Pac back to its camp but could not use this success further. Both armies found themselves in a stalemate and the slow approach of the winter in a ravaged environment was seen as a threat to both sides. The hostilities on the Basya river ended when the Poles heard the news of Ivan Khovansky campaign and decided to leave. Dolgorukov had no order of the Tsar to pursuit the Poles and stayed, awaiting reinforcement from his brother.

Strategically, the 1660 campaign showed that the Commonwealth was not able to decide the war on its own even after signing peace with Sweden.

References 
 Malov A.V. Russo-Polish War (1654–1667). Moscow: Exprint, 2006. .

Conflicts in 1660
1660 in Europe
Basya